Chaco patagonica is a species of mygalomorph spiders of Argentina, named after its type locality, the Patagonia in Chubut, Argentina. The species can be distinguished from C. tecka by not having a patterned cephalothorax and legs, by possessing less maxillary cuspules and by the absence of pseudopreening combs. It also differs from C. sanjuanina by having few labial cuspules.

Description
Its labium length is 45% of its width; its sternum width is 66% of the length. Its labium possesses two cuspules, while the maxillae has six cuspules. A serrula is absent. Its cephalothorax is yellowish, with brown mottles on its caput and posterior part of its thorax; the abdomen is yellowish with mottles. Pubescence is very light.

Behaviour and distribution

The spiders of this species make a small burrow closed with a thin, flaplike door. The door is made from the silk layer lining the interior of the burrow, covered by grains of sand. As the spiders dig their burrow on inclined places (about 45 degrees), the sand falls over it when the flap is closed, covering the burrow fully. It has only been found at its type locality.

See also
Spider anatomy
List of Nemesiidae species

References

External links

ADW entry

Nemesiidae
Spiders of Argentina
Spiders described in 1995